The Karakallou Monastery is an Eastern Orthodox monastery at the monastic state of Mount Athos in Greece. It stands on the south-eastern side of the peninsula and ranks eleventh in the hierarchy of the Athonite monasteries. The monastery has 50 working monks, and its library holds 330 manuscripts, and about 3,000 printed books.

History
It was founded in the 11th century. In the 13th century, as a result of the activity of pirates and Latins, Karakallou was totally deserted.

By the end of the 15th century according to the Russian pilgrim Isaiah, the monastery was Albanian. The monastery was rebuilt in the 16th century by Moldavian voievod Peter IV Rareș.

Nearby sites
It was founded by St. Athanasius to serve as a place of convalescence for monks. It is a complex with a defensive tower and vineyards. Patriarch Joachim III of Constantinople, also rested here in the 19th century. Today it is used as a winery and is known for its excellent quality wine.

References

External links 

 Karakallou monastery at Mount Athos 
 Greek Ministry of Culture: Holy Monastery of Karakallou

Christian monasteries established in the 11th century
Monasteries on Mount Athos
Greek Orthodox monasteries
Byzantine monasteries in Greece